Colosseo is a station on Line B of the Rome Metro. It was opened on 10 February 1955 and is located, as its name suggests, in the Monti rione on via del Colosseo near the Colosseum. The station is currently being expanded to be the new northern terminus of Metro's Line C.

Its atrium houses mosaics from the Artemetro Roma Prize. They are by Pietro Dorazio (Italy), Kenneth Noland (United States) and Emil Schumacher (Germany). The main exit is on the lower level, in front of the Colosseum on the Piazza Del Colosseo and to the right of the Arch of Constantine, whilst the other exit is a second story one, located in the middle of the Largo Gaetana Agnesi park above the Piazza.

Surroundings 
 Domus Aurea
 Basilica of Maxentius
 Parco del Celio
 Ospedale militare del Celio

Churches 
 San Pietro in Vincoli
 Santo Stefano Rotondo
 Santi Giovanni e Paolo 
 Santi Quattro Coronati
 Basilica di San Clemente

Other buildings 
 Palazzo Venezia
 Palazzo Del Grillo 
 Lapidario di Roma

Forums 
 Roman Forum
 Imperial fora
 Forum of Augustus
 Forum of Caesar
 Forum of Nerva
 Forum of Trajan

Campidoglio 
 Campidoglio
 Musei Capitolini
 Cordonata

Notes

External links 

The station on the site of ATAC.

Rome Metro Line B stations
Rome Metro Line C stations
Railway stations opened in 1955
1955 establishments in Italy
Rome R. I Monti
Railway stations in Italy opened in the 20th century